These are the individual stories, usually referred to as "yarns", set in Frank Miller's Sin City universe. They are listed here in order of publication.

The Hard Goodbye

First published as Sin City in Dark Horse Presents issues #51–62 and 5th Anniversary Special (June 1991–June 1992), and reprinted as Sin City (The Hard Goodbye) in trade paperback form (January 1993), The Hard Goodbye is the first comic book story that Frank Miller drew and wrote about the desperate denizens of Basin City/"Sin City". The protagonist is Marv, a chivalrous yet dangerous and possibly psychotic ex-convict with a penchant for fine coats. Marv meets a mysterious and very beautiful woman at Kadie's bar. The woman seduces Marv much to his surprise and delight, since he doesn't usually attract women due to scars from his many years as a street fighter. Marv wakes up after a one-night stand to discover Goldie, the woman he had just met and had sex with, has been killed in the night. When he hears sirens of the police drawing near (long before anyone but he and the killer could know what had happened) he realizes that he is being framed by someone with a lot of money and influence in Basin City. The thirteen-part serial follows Marv on his single-minded quest to understand why Goldie was killed and bring revenge upon her murderers.

This story is one of three Sin City stories retold in the movie Sin City. In the film version, Mickey Rourke plays Marv, Jaime King plays Goldie and Wendy, Carla Gugino plays Lucille, Elijah Wood plays Kevin, and Rutger Hauer plays Cardinal Roark.

A Dame to Kill For

First published November 1993–May 1994, A Dame to Kill For is the second compilation of the Sin City series. It chronicles Dwight's attempts to rescue Ava Lord, his former fiancée, from her husband and servant, who she says are sadistically torturing her. Dwight begins to suspect that things aren't what they seem with Ava. 

The story begins as Dwight McCarthy, working as a photographer for a grossly overweight man named Agamemnon, saves one of the Old Town prostitutes from one of her customers, whom Dwight was investigating on behalf of his wife; he then drives her back to Old Town. That night, he receives a call from a woman named Ava, asking him to meet her at a seedy bar called Kadie's Club Pecos. Dwight is suspicious of her, as Ava broke his heart four years ago by running off with another richer man, but he agrees to meet her anyway. Marv is also there and greets Dwight. Ava arrives late (as she often used to) and tries to persuade Dwight to take her back, claiming that her life is "a living Hell"; Dwight refuses to listen. Just then, Manute, Ava's husband's valet, arrives and takes Ava away. Dwight goes home, but cannot sleep. He decides to check up on Ava and her new husband, Damien Lord.

He hops a fence and, using his photography equipment, scopes out the estate and, in particular, Ava, who is swimming in the nude. He is discovered and claims that he is simply a Peeping Tom. Manute, who seemingly doesn't recognize him from the bar, beats him brutally before throwing him from a car into the street. Dwight calls Agamemnon for a ride home and they stop several times for fast food.

As Dwight arrives home, he finds his Ford Mustang returned and his door unlocked. In his bedroom is a nude Ava. Following a heated argument, they eventually reconcile and make love. Manute arrives and violently beats naked Dwight. Dwight is knocked out of his upper story apartment window to the street below, where he blacks out momentarily. He awakens to see Manute driving off with Ava.

Determined to rescue her, Dwight arrives at Kadie’s, where Marv is in the middle of a squabble with some out-of-town punks. One of them pulls a gun on Marv, who knocks him flat; the rest quickly scatter. Dwight convinces Marv, over several drinks and whilst watching Nancy dance, to help him storm Damien's estate. As they approach the mansion, Dwight insists Marv leave the punk's gun, which Marv has procured, in the car. Marv tackles the guards as a distraction and eventually takes on Manute, ripping his right eye out and beating him savagely.

With Manute and the guards occupied, Dwight makes his way to Damien. When he finds him in his office, he beats him to death. As Dwight begins to realize what he has done, Ava appears, and explains how Dwight was all a part of her plan to get Damien murdered so she could inherit his estate. She shoots Dwight six times, including once in the head. Dwight once again falls out of a window and is picked up by Marv. Upon Dwight's insistence, Marv drives him to Old Town, where Dwight has his old flame, Gail, help him. The girls of Old Town perform surgery on Dwight's multiple bullet wounds, then ask him to leave. He convinces Gail and Miho, a deadly assassin he saved three years prior, to let him stay, and they operate further on him.

Two detectives following up on Damien Lord's death, Mort and Bob, talk to Ava. She claims that Dwight was a stalker psychopath who killed Damien out of jealousy. They believe her story, and Mort starts sleeping with her. They interrogate Agamemnon, who tells how Dwight is an upright man who went clean after being a wild alcoholic with a short temper in his younger days. When they speak with Dwight's landlady, she tells about letting Ava in and the resulting loud noises of the fight the night of Damien's murder. Bob doubts Ava considerably now, while Mort, who is still sleeping with her, becomes more on-edge towards his partner. This culminates with Mort killing Bob, then committing suicide. (On an unrelated note, during the scene in which Mort kills Bob, while they are driving in the car you can clearly see Wendy and Marv drive past them, presumably on their way to butcher Kevin.)

Meanwhile, Dwight is recovering from his near-fatal wounds and calls Ava to inform her he's coming for her soon. Ava, with her late husband's financial assets, is joining her corporation with the mob boss Wallenquist. Unaffected by Ava's flirting, he warns her not to underestimate him again and tells her to tie up her loose ends with Dwight; he has someone arriving from Phoenix soon to meet her about that.

Dwight (with his new face), accompanied by Gail and Miho, poses as Wallenquist's man from Phoenix. Inside Ava's estate, however, Manute sees past the new face and captures Dwight. Gail and Miho strike from Dwight's car, and Dwight shoots Manute with a hidden .25 he had up his left sleeve. Six bullets fail to kill him, and Manute aims shakily at Dwight as Ava grabs one of Manute's guns, shooting Manute in his shoulder. Manute falls through a window and, upon landing, is stabbed in the arms by Miho, pinning him to the ground. Ava then tries to get Dwight to kill him, telling him that Manute had her under mind control to manipulate her and Damien and that it would be a cruel irony if he killed her now. Dwight finally sees through all the lies and kills Ava.

The Babe Wore Red and Other Stories

First published November 1994, The Babe Wore Red and Other Stories is a publication of short stories:
 "And Behind Door Number Three..." (4 pages long)
 "The Customer Is Always Right" (3 pages long) – first published in San Diego Comic Con Comics #2 (August 1993)
 "The Babe Wore Red" (23 pages long) It reprints a serial run in Previews.

"And Behind Door Number Three..." is a short story about Gail and Wendy (who's now wearing Marv's necklace) setting a trap for a man they suspect is 'carving up' girls in Old Town.

The enigmatic "Cowboy" is captured by the allure of Wendy and subsequently shot and tied up by Gail. Although the Cowboy is willing to confess to the cops, the girls have other plans and invite Miho to finish the job.

"The Customer Is Always Right" served as the opening sequence for the film Sin City, which featured Josh Hartnett and Marley Shelton. The sequence served as the original proof of concept footage that director Robert Rodriguez filmed to convince Frank Miller to allow him to adapt Sin City to the silver screen.

The story involves an enigmatic tryst between two nameless characters; "The Customer" and "The Salesman." They meet on the terrace of a high rise building, hinting that although they seem to be acting like strangers, they do indeed have some sort of past. It is unclear what their past involves even as they embrace in a passionate kiss.

A silenced gunshot stabs the night air to reveal that The Salesman has shot The Customer. The reader is led to believe that The Customer had fallen into a serious and difficult situation and, with no other feasible alternative, hired The Salesman to kill her. Later information given by Frank Miller on the commentary of the Recut & Extended DVD Edition states that The Customer had an affair with a member of the mafia, and when she found out tried to break it off with him. The mafia member then swore to her that she would die in the most terrible way possible, and when it is least expected. The Customer, having connections, hires The Salesman (who is referred to as "The Lady-Killer") to kill her. In the comic The Salesman is the Colonel, as Miller has verified in the BLAM! section page 29 of the one-shot issue "Sex & Violence."

"The Babe Wore Red" centers around the character of Dwight and the murder of his friend Fargo. Dwight stumbles upon the hanging corpse of Fargo in his apartment and encounters Mr Shlubb, half of the recurring supporting duo, Douglas Klump and Burt Shlubb (aka Fat Man and Little Boy).

He knocks out Shlubb and finds the titular character hiding in the shower. Under a barrage of sniper shots from Douglas Klump, Dwight and the Babe reach their car and speed off. Although they successfully elude the pair, Dwight refuses to let them off easy, choosing rather to head to The Farm to deal with them. In the meantime, the Babe introduces herself as a hooker named Mary, but Dwight can tell she's lying. He duels with both of them again and due to insistence from Mary decides to shoot them in the leg instead of killing them. He eventually receives a package from Fargo who had shipped it off before his untimely demise. Dwight reads up on the whole situation and realizes that Fargo was simply the scapegoat for illegal drug-related activities and had paid the ultimate price. He also receives a package from Mary. She was not a hooker, rather a nun that had flirted with temptation before ultimately deciding to dedicate her life to God.

The time frame for the story is given as during the time Marv spent on death row in "The Hard Goodbye", as noted when Dwight mentions that he had a friend on death row because of what happened at the Roark family farm.

The Big Fat Kill

First published in five issues November 1994–March 1995, The Big Fat Kill opens in Shellie's apartment, where a drunken former fling is furiously rapping on her door, demanding to be let in. Shellie is obviously scared, but is comforted by Dwight who has gotten a new face (see A Dame To Kill For). Dwight tells the barmaid to let the man and his ensuing entourage in, expressing confidence in his ability to 'handle them'. When the man outside threatens to break down her door, Shellie reluctantly opens it while Dwight hides in the bathroom. Dwight deals with the man, who then leaves, heading into Old Town. The story deals with the repercussions of Dwight's and the Old Town Girls' actions towards him.

The story is one of three from Sin City related in the film Sin City. In the film, Clive Owen plays Dwight, Brittany Murphy plays Shellie, Benicio del Toro plays Jack, Rosario Dawson plays Gail, Devon Aoki plays Miho, Alexis Bledel plays Becky, and Michael Clarke Duncan plays Manute.

"Silent Night"

"Silent Night" is a one-shot short story that Frank Miller released in November 1995. It is a 26-page story featuring Marv. It has almost no dialogue; only one speech bubble appears in the entire story. The original issue had no functional cover, i.e. the story started on the top page, which had no title, author or publisher information. These were appended at the end of the issue.

Against a backdrop of heavy snow, Marv (a hulking, scarred figure in a trenchcoat) approaches a door in a dark alley. He intimidates the bouncer, Fatman, by simply glaring at him, and is let in. He proceeds down a flight of stairs, and is met by two men with machine pistols and a leather-clad woman, who is apparently their boss. Marv hands her a wad of bills and is shown to a steel door in the far wall. Through a small viewing slit, he can see a terrified little girl crouching in darkness in the room beyond. It is not stated, but is apparent that the child was being sold for sex. Marv draws two pistols and kills the pair of henchmen, then executes the woman, the only time he kills a woman in all of his Sin City appearances. He says to the little girl, "Your momma's been asking after you, Kimberly. Let's get you home." Cuddling the girl gently in his arms, he walks off into the distance, as the snow obscures his receding form.

That Yellow Bastard

First published in February 1996–July 1996, That Yellow Bastard is a six-issue comic book miniseries, and the sixth in the Sin City series. It follows the usual black and white noir style artistry of previous Sin City novels. The first collected edition by Dark Horse Comics became available in July 1997.

The story begins more than eight years before any other Sin City book takes place, with possibly the most noble, and heroic protagonist in the Sin City universe, policeman John Hartigan (suffering from severe angina problems) on his final mission before his forced retirement. Roark Junior, son of one of the most powerful and corrupt officials in Basin City, is indulging his penchant for raping and murdering pre-pubescent girls. It is Hartigan's mission to rescue Junior's latest quarry, a thin eleven-year-old named Nancy Callahan. Hartigan rescues her, but only after severely wounding Junior and sending him into a coma. Hartigan is then framed for kidnapping and raping Nancy, and sent to prison for eight years, until he manages to achieve parole and attempts to locate and protect Nancy from Roark's men.

In the film adaptation, Bruce Willis stars as Hartigan, Jessica Alba as Nancy, Nick Stahl as the Yellow Bastard/Junior, Powers Boothe as Senator Roark and Michael Madsen as Hartigan's partner, Bob. There are only a few notable differences in the film version: Mort is replaced by Bob when Hartigan is released from prison, an appearance by Carla Gugino as Lucille is omitted (but reinstated in the extended version released to DVD), and Senator Roark (Powers Boothe) has a mustache.

In the DVD commentary, Frank Miller indicated that he was initially motivated to write That Yellow Bastard after his disappointment with The Dead Pool, the fifth and final film in the Dirty Harry series. Nancy—who prior to this story had no last name—was named "Callahan", a name shared with Clint Eastwood's character.

"Daddy's Little Girl"

"Daddy's Little Girl" was first published in A Decade of Dark Horse #1 (July 1996) and reprinted in Tales to Offend #1 (July 1997), Booze, Broads, and Bullets, and Dark Horse Day 2016 Sampler (June 2016).

Johnny is a middle-aged man who seems to be in love with a much younger girl by the name of Amy. Amy insists that they cannot be together and alludes to the solution that he kills her father. Torn by his emotions and manipulated by Amy, he attempts to confront her father first, asking for her hand in marriage. Daddy refuses and Johnny shoots him with a revolver that Amy gave him. Daddy then reveals that the gun was in fact loaded with blanks and was a plot orchestrated by him and Amy. The two are either lovers with a daddy/daughter fetish based relationship or a father and daughter in an incestuous relationship. Daddy strangles Johnny for sexual satisfaction, and it implied this was the only way he was able to become aroused.

Lost, Lonely, & Lethal

First published December 1996, Lost, Lonely & Lethal contains three stories:
 "Fat Man and Little Boy" (3 pages) – first published in San Diego Comic Con Comics #4 (July 1996)
 "Blue Eyes" (14 pages)
 "Rats" (7 pages)

"Fat Man and Little Boy" is a short three-page story about Douglas Klump and Burt Shlubb, who also appear in That Yellow Bastard and Family Values. These characters use a large vocabulary to make it appear that they are more intelligent than they truthfully are. However their wordy speeches are sprinkled with malapropisms. In this yarn, Shlubb's boots are in horrible shape, and he wishes to steal the shoes off a corpse, wrapped in a rug, that they're supposed to dump in the river.

Klump tells him that they're supposed to leave the body as it is. Shlubb disagrees and pulls the boots off, to discover that there are no feet in them, and a ticking sound rings through their ears. This was apparently a test, and the two buffoons get thrown several yards away as the explosion hits. It seems they failed the test miserably.

"Blue Eyes", the second story, begins as a man named Jim notices someone he assumes is a hitman following him. He runs into Kadie's, where he is confronted by an ex-flame named Delia. Marv is sitting next to them at the bar, and provides some comic relief. The hitman enters the bar, and Jim convinces Delia to leave with him. Marv then steals his drink, reasoning that it would have gone to waste otherwise.

Jim and Delia go back to his place and make love. She then attacks him, and explains that this is her test. She wants to become a hitwoman, and she must first kill the only man she ever loved. After killing Jim, the Colonel appears - he was the 'hitman' who had been following Jim. He gives her an assignment, and she takes on the name 'Blue Eyes', which is what Jim used to call her.

Blue Eyes is shown to take place at the same time as A Dame To Kill For, as part of the story shows Gail telling Shelley what to tell the police about Dwight.  The story also has brief appearances by many characters, including Miho, Agammemnon and Manute.

"Rats" is the final story, it is about a disturbed war criminal who eats dog food. It was adapted to a 2004 fan film of the same name.

A sadistic war criminal (and presumed Nazi) stuffs rats in his oven to eat as he mentally rambles about the London Blitz, his arthritis, and how he killed all the 'rats', which were all people. A vigilante known amongst readers as 'The Janitor' kicks down the door and incapacitates him, before shoving his head into the oven, gassing him to death.

Sex & Violence

Sex & Violence was first published in March 1997 and only contains two stories, both of which feature Delia:
 "Wrong Turn" (23 pages)
 "Wrong Track" (3 pages)
The two stories take place on the same night, with the second taking place minutes after the first.

"Wrong Turn" is the first story, in which a man named Phil drives aimlessly in the rain, eventually finding Delia unconscious on a dirt road. He picks her up, and she tells him that she must have got struck by lightning. He offers to take her to the hospital, but she refuses. She asks if he is married, and he says that he is not. She takes him to the pits, and they make love. In the middle of it, he confesses that he is, in fact, married.

She starts choking him and calls him by the name of Eddie. She claims he has a trunk-load of stolen jewels he plans to sell in Sacred Oaks, violating an exclusivity agreement with the Wallenquist Organization. He explains that he is a used car salesman named Phil, and she understands. Eddie was supposed to be driving a similar Studebaker, and looked very similar. She sticks the heel of her shoe in his eye socket, killing him. She meets up with the Colonel and Gordo at the entrance to the pits. They check the trunk of Phil's car and find his wife with six bullets in her chest. They throw him in as well and Gordo pushes the car into the pits. Delia explains that she has a train to catch.

"Wrong Track" is the second story, which picks up soon after. Eddie is riding the train. His internal monologue explains that he had a flat tire. Delia hits on him, and they make love near the back of the train.

When they're done, she snaps his neck and throws him off the train. Leaving the rear of the train, the Colonel waits for her. "Delia-- do you plan to make love to each and every one of them?" he asks. Her response is "Only the ones I like."

"Just Another Saturday Night"

"Just Another Saturday Night" was first published in Sin City #1/2 (August 1997), a limited mail-in comic available only through a special offer in Wizard #73. It was later reprinted in a mass-market edition as Just Another Saturday Night (October 1998).

It is the story of what Marv was up to on the night John Hartigan met back up with Nancy (from That Yellow Bastard). Marv regains consciousness on a highway overlooking the Projects, surrounded by dead young guys, unable to remember how he got there. He lights one of the dead guys' cigarettes and thinks back; since it is Saturday, he deduces he must have been at Kadie's watching Nancy dance.

Marv was rather depressed after seeing Nancy leave with Hartigan, as he had always had an unrequited crush on her, so the barkeep gives him a bottle to drown his sorrow with. He gets drunk and steps outside, only to find some preppy college kids trying to burn drunks and winos to death. He immediately kills one of them and chases the rest to The Projects, where along the way he destroys a police patrol car and hijacks another vehicle. At the Projects, it is clear that they are being watched, but Marv uses hand signals to identify himself and instruct his former neighbors to attack the kids, and they do so by firing arrows at them and providing Marv with a knife. After questioning the last surviving kid about him being called 'Bernini boy' (it was the name of the brand of coat he was wearing), he slits his throat. This done, he muses, "And one fine coat it is. Somebody must've spent a fortune on it. I wonder who?" But he cannot seem to remember where he got the coat or gloves.

The story served as the opening sequence for the film Sin City: A Dame to Kill For.

Family Values

Family Values was first published in (October 1997) and was the fifth "yarn" in Frank Miller's Sin City series. Unlike the previous four stories, Family Values was released as a 128-page graphic novel rather than in serialized issues that would later be collected in a trade paperback volume. The plot concerns Dwight and Miho going on a mission from Gail to dig up information about a recent mob hit at a small diner.

Booze, Broads, & Bullets
Booze, Broads, & Bullets is a compilation of stories from the Sin City series of comic books by Frank Miller. It reprints all the short stories, in the following order:

 "Just Another Saturday Night" (from Sin City #1/2 and also reprinted in Just Another Saturday Night)
 "Fat Man and Little Boy" (from Lost, Lonely, & Lethal)
 "The Customer Is Always Right" (from The Babe Wore Red and Other Stories)
 "Silent Night" (from Silent Night)
 "And Behind Door Number Three..." (from The Babe Wore Red and Other Stories)
 "Blue Eyes" (from Lost, Lonely, & Lethal)
 "Rats" (from Lost, Lonely, & Lethal)
 "Daddy's Little Girl" (from A Decade of Dark Horse #1 and also reprinted in Tales to Offend #1)
 "Wrong Turn" (from Sex & Violence)
 "Wrong Track" (from Sex & Violence)
 "The Babe Wore Red" (from The Babe Wore Red and Other Stories)

Hell and Back

Hell and Back was first published in (July 1999–April 2000)

Hell and Back is the longest of the Sin City stories, spanning 9 issues. It tells the story of Wallace, an artist/war hero/short order cook who saves a suicidal woman named Esther. She likes his art and they go out for a drink. They are ambushed by two men, who drug Wallace and kidnap Esther. When Wallace recovers, he vows to find Esther and deal with those who kidnapped her.

References

Comics-related lists